These are the official results of the Women's shot put event at the 1990 European Championships in Split, Yugoslavia, held at Stadion Poljud on 27 August 1990. There were a total number of thirteen participating athletes, and no qualification.

Medalists

Final

Participation
According to an unofficial count, 13 athletes from 8 countries participated in the event.

 (3)
 (1)
 (1)
 (2)
 (1)
 (1)
 (1)
 (3)

See also
 1988 Women's Olympic Shot Put (Seoul)
 1990 Shot Put Year Ranking
 1991 Women's World Championships Shot Put (Tokyo)
 1992 Women's Olympic Shot Put (Barcelona)
 1994 Women's European Championships Shot Put (Helsinki)

References

 Results

Shot put
Shot put at the European Athletics Championships
1990 in women's athletics